The 3CX Phone System is the software-based private branch exchange (PBX) Phone system developed and marketed by the company, 3CX. The 3CX Phone System is based on the SIP (Session Initiation Protocol) standard and enables extensions to make calls via the public switched telephone network (PSTN) or via Voice over Internet Protocol (VoIP) services on premises, in the cloud, or via a cloud service owned and operated by the 3CX company. The 3CX Phone System is available for Windows, Linux, Raspberry Pi and supports standard SIP soft/hard phones, VoIP services, faxing, voice and web meetings, as well as traditional PSTN phone lines.

History
3CX was developed by 3CX, an international VoIP IP PBX software development technology company as an open-standards, software-based PBX. First published as a free IP PBX product in 2006, the product was intended to provide a VoIP product for use in a Microsoft Windows environment.

The first commercial edition of the product was launched in 2007. Reviews of the product have noted its easy configuration, management, and hardware compatibility. Smith on VoIP commented in a blog post about 3CX that it was very easy to use. In 2009, it was featured on the internet TV show Hak5. On 7 June 2017, 3CX released version 15.5 with a feature set from WebRTC video conferencing, presence, chat, voicemail and a new Web Client. In the next years, Live Chat, SMS and Facebook integrations were added, as well as the Microsoft Teams in the latest V18.

Features
3CX Phone System consists of a number of software-based components. The PBX, accessed and managed via a web-based management console, softphone for Windows, and smartphone clients for iOS and Android. The phone system can be used with either SIP phones or the clients, or a combination of the two. The PBX provides unified communications functionality including presence, chat, voicemail to email, fax to email, integrated video conferencing, call conferencing, Live Chat, SMS, and additional integrations with Facebook and a number of CRM platforms.

Release History

Table created according to the "3CX Phone System Build History".

See also
 Voice modem
 Comparison of VoIP software
 List of SIP software
 IP PBX

References

Communication software
Telephone exchange equipment